Kathleen Berry (born 1908 or 1909) was a noted English table tennis player who had her first success in a game play at Harrods in February 1922 when she was thirteen.

Table tennis career
Her greatest international success was in mixed doubles at the 1934 World Table Tennis Championships where she was paired with Laszlo Bellak. Information about her becomes scarce after her competing in the 1935 World Table Tennis Championships.

She competed in the mixed doubles event at the 1926 World Table Tennis Championships with her brother Reginald Henry Berry.

Tournament wins
1922 Harrods Open
1922/23 Daily Mirror British Championship
1924/25 Middlesex Championship
1924/25 London League Championship
1925/26 Middlesex Championship
1925/26 London League Championship

See also
 List of table tennis players
 List of World Table Tennis Championships medalists

References 

World Table Tennis Championships medalists
1900s births
Year of death missing
English female table tennis players